The men's light welterweight (63.5 kg/139.7 lbs) Low-Kick category at the W.A.K.O. World Championships 2007 in Belgrade was the fifth lightest of the male Low-Kick tournaments, involving twenty-two fighters from three continents (Europe, Asia and Africa).  Each of the matches was three rounds of two minutes each and were fought under Low-Kick rules.

Due to the fact there were too few fighters for a thirty-two man tournament, ten of the fighters had byes through to the second round.  The tournament gold medalist was Artur Magadov from Russia who defeated the Moroccan Soufiane Zridy by unanimous decision in the final.  Defeated semi finalists Mihajio Jovanovic from Serbia and Mirlan Ibraimov from Kyrgyzstan had to make do with bronze medals.

Results

Key

See also
List of WAKO Amateur World Championships
List of WAKO Amateur European Championships
List of male kickboxers

References

External links
 WAKO World Association of Kickboxing Organizations Official Site

Kickboxing events at the WAKO World Championships 2007 Belgrade
2007 in kickboxing
Kickboxing in Serbia